Stephen Owen, (born September 8, 1948) is a Canadian administrator and politician. Owen was the Vice-President of External, Legal and Community Relations for the University of British Columbia.

Owen was the Member of Parliament for the electoral district of Vancouver Quadra, encompassing the western end of the City of Vancouver. He was a member of Prime Minister Paul Martin's Liberal government, serving in cabinet as Canada's tenth Minister of Western Economic Diversification and as Minister of State for Sport.

Early career
Owen received LL.M. from University College London/University of London in 1974. He received MBA from the International Management Institute, University of Geneva in 1986, and J.D. from the University of British Columbia in 1972.

During the 1980s, Owen worked for the government of British Columbia as a non-partisan official. He served as that province's ombudsman from 1986 to 1992, and as Commissioner for the ground-breaking Commission on Resources and Environment, which pioneered the province's multi-stakeholder land-use planning approach from 1992 to 1995. Subsequently Owen was the Deputy Attorney General for B.C. and, then, the David Lam Professor of Law & Public Policy, and Director, Institute for Dispute Resolution, University of Victoria (1997–2000) He is also the past commissioner and vice-president of the Law Commission of Canada. His cousin, Philip Owen, is a former mayor of Vancouver.

Federal politics
Owen was first elected to the House of Commons in the 2000 federal election. He was appointed to Prime Minister Jean Chrétien's cabinet on January 15, 2002, serving as Secretary of State for both Western Economic Diversification and Indian Affairs and Northern Development. On December 12, 2003, he was promoted by newly appointed Martin to Minister of Public Works and Government Services. In this capacity, he was a frequent target of opposition questions on the "sponsorship scandal". During his tenure, Owen was involved in the recovery of misappropriated public funds from Hewlett Packard; the company paid C$146 million to the government of Canada, and both parties agreed to jointly pursue companies who may also have been involved.

Owen defeated former provincial cabinet minister Stephen Rogers in the federal election of 2004, winning by a much greater margin than most observers anticipated (he received 52.28% of the vote compared to Rogers' 26.24%.)  He was named Minister of Western Economic Diversification and Minister of State for Sport on July 20, 2004. Under normal circumstances, this would have been considered a demotion, but the shuffle placed Owen in a powerful managerial position for preparation for the upcoming Olympic Games in British Columbia.

During the federal election of 2006, held to elect the 39th Parliament, Owen again defeated Rogers and maintain his seat in Vancouver Quadra. Following the election, Owen was one of the early supporters of Michael Ignatieff for the Liberal Party leadership. Stephen Owen resigned his seat on July 27, 2007, and accepted a position at the University of British Columbia

References

External links
 Honourable Stephen Owen, QC, PC
VP External Stephen Owen will not renew term at UBC https://web.archive.org/web/20130408081417/http://ubyssey.ca/news/vp-external-stephen-owen666/

1948 births
Alumni of University College London
Liberal Party of Canada MPs
Living people
Members of the 26th Canadian Ministry
Members of the 27th Canadian Ministry
Members of the House of Commons of Canada from British Columbia
Members of the King's Privy Council for Canada
Politicians from Vancouver
Peter A. Allard School of Law alumni